The 2003 Harrogate Council election took place on 1 May 2003 to elect members of Harrogate Borough Council in North Yorkshire, England. One third of the council was up for election and the council stayed under no overall control.

After the election, the composition of the council was:
Conservative 27
Liberal Democrat 25
Independent 2

Campaign
Before the election the Liberal Democrats had 27 seats on the council, the Conservatives 26 and there was 1 independent. The campaign saw the national leaders of the Conservative and Liberal Democrat parties, Iain Duncan Smith and Charles Kennedy, visit Harrogate to support their parties.

The Liberal Democrats defended their record in control of the council, pointing to an improvement in the council finances, providing new facilities for the area, keeping Harrogates portion of the council tax rises low and tackling anti-social behaviour. However the Conservatives attacked "over intensive housing development" for causing traffic congestion, said they were the only party opposed to congestion charging, proposed to provide an hours free parking for residents and to work with police to tackle anti-social behaviour.

Election result
The results saw no party win a majority on the council, but the Conservatives became the largest party with 27 seats, compared to 25 for the Liberal Democrats and 2 independents. The Conservatives gained Bilton and High Harrogate wards from the Liberal Democrats, the latter by 656 votes to 610 after a recount. These gains came despite the Liberal Democrats winning slightly more votes overall in the election, 46.5% compared to 44.7% for the Conservatives. However the Conservatives did lose one seat in Ripon Moorside, which was taken by independent Charles Powell. Meanwhile, Labour failed to win any seats and only came second in Woodfield ward. Overall turnout in the election was 34.7%.

Following the election the Conservatives took control of the council, with Conservative Mike Gardner becoming council leader, replacing Liberal Democrat Geoff Webber. Meanwhile, the outgoing mayor of Harrogate Alan Skidmore quit the Liberal Democrats after the election to become an independent, criticising the party both nationally and locally.

Ward results

References

2003
2003 English local elections
2000s in North Yorkshire